Pfaffenhofen is a municipality in the district of Innsbruck-Land in the Austrian state of Tyrol located 22 km west of Innsbruck and 1.7 km south of Telfs. The village was mentioned in documents in 1197 for the first time.

Population

References

External links

Cities and towns in Innsbruck-Land District